Azhiyatha Kolangal 2 is a 2019 Tamil-language drama film written and directed by M. R. Bharathi and produced by Easwari Rao. The film features starring Prakash Raj, Revathi and Archana in the leading roles, while Nassar appears in a pivotal role. Featuring music composed by Aravind Siddhartha, Azhiyatha Kolangal began production in September 2015.

Cast 
Prakash Raj as Gowri Shankar
Revathi as Sita, Gowri Shankar's wife
Archana as Mohana, Gowri Shankar's ex-lover
Easwari Rao as News Reader
Nassar as Asst. Commissioner
Mohan Raman as Doctor
Vijay Krishnaraj as Politician
Sathya Sai as Mohana's daughter
G. Aadhithya as birthday kid

Production 
Debutant director Mani Bharathi quietly began working on a film project starring Prakash Raj, Revathi, Archana and Nassar in the lead roles during June 2015. Revathi and Archana had initially decided to produce the film, but former actress Easwari Rao later agreed to fund the project. The shoot progressed in Chennai, with Prakash Raj revealed to be portraying a writer, and the film developed under the tentative title of Kavingan Aakinaal Ennai. The film's first look poster was revealed on 14 January 2016, coinciding with Pongal.

Reception
Times of India wrote "The only saving grace of the film is the performance of the lead characters. A lion's share of the film is shot indoors - the lack of novelty in visuals coupled with overdramatic dialogues and scenes spoil the plot". Cinema Express wrote "With heavyweights like Prakashraj, Revathi, Nasser, and Archana, the performances alone should have saved the film but when the director’s dialogues leave no room for expression, even the veterans can only do so much. Yet, the film tries to appeal to your heart. Bharathi’s thoughts are modern but his film is not. The film means well. It has good intentions, but good intentions don’t always make good cinema".

References

External links 
 

2010s Tamil-language films
2019 films
Indian drama films
2019 directorial debut films
2019 drama films